Biram may refer to:

People
Arthur Biram, Israeli philosopher and educator
Scott H. Biram, American musician
Biram Dah Abeid, Mauritanian politician and anti-slavery advocate

Places
Hadejia, previously Biram, a town in Northern Nigeria
Kafr Bir'im, a village in the British Mandate of Palestine

Jewish surnames